Thomas Allen Harris is a critically acclaimed, interdisciplinary artist who explores family, identity, and spirituality in a participatory practice. Since 1990, Harris has remixed archives from multiple origins throughout his work, challenging hierarchy within historical narratives through the use of pioneering documentary and research methodologies that center vernacular image and collaboration. He is currently working on a new television show, Family Pictures USA, which takes a radical look at neighborhoods and cities of the United States through the lens of family photographs, collaborative performances, and personal testimony sourced from their communities..

Harris’ participatory practice grew out of deeply collaborative work he engaged in early in his career with a vanguard of queer filmmakers of color, including Cheryl Dunye, Yvonne Welbon, Raul Ferrera Balanquet, Shari Frilot, and Marlon Riggs. As a staff producer for WNET (New York’s PBS affiliate) on their show THE ELEVENTH HOUR, Harris produced public television segments around HIV/AIDS activism and its intersection with the culture wars from 1987-1991. In 1990 he curated the first New York/San Francisco Gay and Lesbian Town Hall meeting, a three-hour public television event which culminated in the broadcast of Marlon Riggs’ Tongues Untied. In 1997, Harris and 6 other queer filmmakers of color produced a document titled Narrating Our History: A Dialogue Among Queer Media Artists From the African Diaspora. This piece has been published in Sisters in the Life: A History of Out African American Lesbian Media-Making (2018, ed. Yvonne Welbon and Alexandra Juhasz).

Harris’ deeply personal and experimental films have received critical acclaim at international film/art festivals such as Sundance, Berlin, Toronto, Tribeca, FESPACO, Outfest, Flaherty, Cape Town, and the Melbourne Art Festival, and have broadcast on POV American documentary series on PBS, AfroPOP, the Sundance Channel, ARTE, as well as CBC, Swedish broadcasting Network, and New Zealand Television. The films include: Twelve Disciples of Nelson Mandela (2005), a story of the anti apartheid movement told through personal testimonies, archival material, and a cast of first time South African actors engaging with the archive; É Minha Cara/That’s My Face (2001), a mythopoetic journey shot completely on Super 8mm film by three generations of Harris’ family on three continents; and VINTAGE - Families of Value (1995), a mosaic portrait of Black families created by handing the camera to three groups of queer siblings, including Harris and his brother Lyle Ashton Harris. These films have re-interpreted the idea of documentary, autobiography, and personal archive through their innovative use of community participation.

In 2009, Harris and his team founded Digital Diaspora Family Reunion (DDFR), a transmedia project that explores and shares the rich and revealing narratives found within family photo albums. Working in partnership with museums, festivals, senior and youth centers, educational institutions, libraries, and cultural arts spaces, DDFR organizes workshops, performances, and exhibitions that create communal linkages affirming our common humanity while privileging the voices of people whose stories have often been absented, marginalized or overlooked. The DDFR archive has grown to include 3,500 interviews with people around their family photos and 30K+ photographs. The project was developed in tandem with Harris’ film Through A Lens Darkly: Black Photographers and the Emergence of a People, in which leading Black cultural figures, scholars, and photographers share their archives with Harris in an exploration of the ways photography has been used as a tool of representation and self-representation in history. The film premiered on Independent Lens on PBS in 2015 and was nominated for a National Emmy and a Peabody Award. The film won the 2015 NAACP Image Award for Outstanding Documentary film, the Fund for Santa Barbara Social Justice Award, and an Africa Movie Academy Award, among others.

A graduate of Harvard College, the Whitney Museum of American Arts Independent Study Program, and the CPB/PBS Producers Academy, Harris is a member of the Academy of Motion Pictures Arts and Sciences. His awards include a Guggenheim Fellowship, United States Artist Award, Rockefeller Fellowship, Sundance Director & Producer Fellowships, a Dartmouth College Montgomery Fellowship, and Independent Spirit Award nomination. A published photographer, curator, and writer with a broad background of community organizing in a socially engaged film/art practice, Harris lectures widely on visual literacy and the use of media as a tool for social change. His media appearances include C-Span, the Tavis Smiley Show, NPR, Metrofocus, AriseTV, and most recently a TEDx Talk. He held a tenured position as Associate Professor of Media Arts at the University of California, San Diego and is joining the faculty of Yale University as a Senior Lecturer in African American and Film & Media Studies, where he is teaching courses titled “Family Narratives/Cultural Shifts” as well as  “Archive Aesthetics and Community Storytelling”.

Filmography

Television 
 Family Pictures USA (2019)

Awards
Harris is a recipient of numerous awards and fellowships including a Tribeca Film Institute's Nelson Mandela Award, and United States Artist Award, Guggenheim Fellowship, Rockefeller Fellowship, as well as CPB/PBS and Sundance Directors Fellowships.  Harris has taught, written and lectured widely on media. He has curated for Gay and Lesbian film festivals including Mix and Outfest. He has also held positions as Associate Professor of Media Arts at the University of California San Diego and a Visiting Professor of Film and New Media at Sarah Lawrence College.

His list of awards, grants, and fellowships include:

 Academy of Motion Picture Arts & Sciences
 Peabody 60 Finalist, 2016
 News & Documentary Emmy Award Nomination, 2016
 Montgomery Fellow, Dartmouth University, 2016
 NAACP Image Award for Outstanding Documentary (Theatrical), 2015
 Notable Videos for Adults, American Library Association, 2015
 Best of Show - Collegiate, National Media Market, 2014
 Best Documentary Feature Award, Baltimore International Black Film Festival, 2014
 African Movie Academy Award for Best Diaspora Documentary, 2014 
 Fund for Santa Barbara Social Justice Award for Documentary Film, 2014
 Festival Programmer’s Award - Best Documentary, Pan African Film Festival, 2014
 Sundance Creative Producers Fellowship, 2013
 Sundance Music and Sound Fellowship, 2013
 Ford Foundation, Postproduction Grant, 2013
 A Blade of Grass, Fellowship, 2012
 Ford Foundation, Postproduction Grant, 2012
 CrossCurrents DDFR Roadshow Grant, 2011
 Rockefeller Foundation NYC Cultural Innovation Fund Award, 2011
 Best Documentary Short, The Long Island Gay and Lesbian Film Festival, 2011
 Tribeca All Access Nelson Mandela Award, 2010; 
 New York Foundation for the Arts Artist Fellowship, 2007
 United States Artist, Rockefeller Fellowship, 2006
 Best Documentary at the Pan-African, 2006
 Best Documentary at the Santa Cruz Film Festivals, 2006
 Henry Hampton Award for Excellence in Documentary Film, Roxbury Film Festival, 2006
 Independent Spirit Award Nomination, Truer Than Fiction, 2005
 Audience Award Honorable Mention, Bermuda International Film Festival, 2006
 New York State Council on the Arts, 2004
 National Endowment for the Arts, 2003
 National Endowment for the Humanities, 2004
 Guggenheim Fellowship, 2003
 Rockefeller Fellowship, 2003
 Best Documentary Award, Outfest, 2002 
 Jury Award for Excellence in Documentary, Atlanta Film Festival, 2002
 New York Foundation for the Arts Fellowship Award, 2002
 Best Documentary Award, San Francisco Black Film Festival, 2002
 Best Documentary Award, Denver Pan-African Film Festival, 2002
 Juror’s Choice Award, Humboldt Short Film Festival, 2002
 Prize of the Ecumenical Jury of Christian Churches, Berlin Film Festival, 2002
 International Filmmaker Award, Black Film and Video Network of Toronto, 2001
 Gordon Parks Award Finalist, Independent Feature Project Market, NY 2001
 Peter Norton Family Fund, 2001
 Paul Robeson Fund, Distribution Award, 2001
 NYSCA, Distribution Award, 2001
 Playboy Foundation Award, 2001
 Experimental Television Workshop Grant, 2001
 Peter Norton Family Fund, 2000
 No Borders Fellowship, the Independent Feature Film Market, New York, 2000
 The Ford Foundation Award, 2000
 Sundance Documentary Producers Conference Fellowship, 2000
 Outstanding Teaching Award, UCSD African and African-American Studies Project, 1999
 New Visions: Video 1999 Award and Residency, The Long Beach Museum of Art, 1999
 Pacific Pioneer Fund Grant, San Francisco, 1998
 WESTAF Grant, 1997
 Best Documentary Video Award, 20th Annual Atlanta Film and Video Festival, 1996
 Golden Gate Award, San Francisco International Film Festival, 1996
 Funding Exchange's Paul Robeson Fund Grant, 1996
 The Glen Eagles Foundation Grant, 1996/7
 The Lannan Foundation Awards, 1995 & 1996
 New York State Council on the Arts Award, 1995
 Whitney Museum of American Art’s 1995 Biennial
 National Endowment for the Arts Grant, 1994
 New York State Council on the Arts Grant, 1993
 Creative Time Inc. Award, 1993
 Banff Nomad Television and Video Residency, 1993
 Jerome Foundation Award, 1992
 Art Matters Inc. Grants, Spring & Winter, 1992
 New York Foundation for the Arts Award, 1992
 Experimental Television Center Artist Residency Program, 1992
 Whitney Museum of American Art, Helena Rubinstein Fellowship, 1991
 Lynn Blumenthal Memorial Fund Award, 1991
 Emmy Nominations for WNET/THIRTEEN shows: Karen Finley & Laurie Anderson, 1990

References

External links
Chimpanzee Productions

Family Pictures USA

Living people
Harvard College alumni
American documentary filmmakers
African-American film directors
American LGBT artists
Film directors from New York City
People from the Bronx
PBS people
Year of birth missing (living people)
21st-century African-American people